Wayne County is a county located in south central Tennessee, along the Alabama border. As of the 2020 census, the population was 16,232. Its county seat is Waynesboro. The county is named after General "Mad Anthony" Wayne, a prominent military leader in the American Revolutionary War.

History
Wayne County was created in 1817 from parts of Hickman and Humphreys counties.  Waynesboro, its county seat, was established in 1821. Located along the Tennessee River, the city of Clifton emerged as a key river port in the mid-19th century.

Geography
It is the second-largest county in Tennessee by area. The county lies primarily along the southwestern Highland Rim. The Tennessee River flows along Wayne County's northwestern border with Decatur County. The Buffalo River, a tributary of the Duck River, flows through the northern part of Wayne County. The Green River, a tributary of the Buffalo, flows through Waynesboro.

Adjacent counties
Perry County (north)
Lewis County (northeast)
Lawrence County (east)
Lauderdale County, Alabama (south)
Hardin County (west)
Decatur County (northwest)

National protected area
 Natchez Trace Parkway (part)

State protected areas

 Arnold Hollow Wildlife Management Area
 Browntown Wildlife Management Area
 Eagle Creek Wildlife Management Area
 Tie Camp Wildlife Management Area

Demographics

2020 census

As of the 2020 United States census, there were 16,232 people, 5,764 households, and 4,016 families residing in the county.

2010 census
As of the census of 2010, there were 17,021 people, 5,822 households, and 4,321 families residing in the county.  The population density was 23 people per square mile (9/km2).  There were 6,701 housing units at an average density of 9 per square mile (4/km2).  The racial makeup of the county was 92.3% White, 5.7% Black or African American, 0.3% Native American, 0.2% Asian, 0.01% Pacific Islander, 0.19% from other races, and 1.0% from two or more races.  1.6% of the population were Hispanic or Latino of any race.

There were 5,936 households, out of which 31.00% had children under the age of 18 living with them, 59.10% were married couples living together, 10.10% had a female householder with no husband present, and 27.20% were non-families. 24.40% of all households were made up of individuals, and 10.90% had someone living alone who was 65 years of age or older.  The average household size was 2.47 and the average family size was 2.93.

In the county, the population was spread out, with 21.40% under the age of 18, 9.10% from 18 to 24, 31.70% from 25 to 44, 24.20% from 45 to 64, and 13.60% who were 65 years of age or older.  The median age was 37 years. For every 100 females there were 121.70 males.  For every 100 females age 18 and over, there were 125.50 males.

The median income for a household in the county was $26,576, and the median income for a family was $30,973. Males had a median income of $27,879 versus $19,034 for females. The per capita income for the county was $14,472.  About 12.90% of families and 16.30% of the population were below the poverty line, including 18.60% of those under age 18 and 19.60% of those age 65 or over.

Religion
The religious affiliations of the people of Wayne County, Tennessee are:

Christian
Southern Baptist Convention (47%)
United Methodist Church (15%)
Independent Free Will Baptist Associations(13%)
Churches of Christ (12%)
Church of God (5%)
National Association of Free Will Baptists (3%)
Cumberland Presbyterian Church (2%)
Presbyterian Church (1%)
International Pentecostal Holiness Church (1%)
Catholic Church (1%)
Church of God of Prophecy (0.8%)
Christian Church (Disciples of Christ) (0.6%)
Seventh-day Adventist Church (0.3%)
Church of the Nazarene (0.1%)
Other (15%)
Baháʼí (0.1%)

Politics
Wayne County is one of the most staunchly Republican leaning counties in Tennessee as well as the country when it comes to presidential elections. In the 20th century, the county was an enclave of the Republican Party in Middle Tennessee, one of few outside Eastern Tennessee in a state that was up until recently Democratic. No Democratic presidential candidate has carried the county since Samuel J. Tilden in the controversial 1876 election.

On rare occasions, the county has voted for Democratic candidates for U.S. Senate and state governor. Al Gore carried Wayne County in  his 1990 reelection bid, though he never carried in either 1992 or 1996 as Bill Clinton's vice presidential running mate or his campaign for the presidency in 2000, in which he also lost his home state. Aside from Gore, Jim Sasser carried the county in his last successful reelection bid for the Senate in 1988, Ned McWherter carried it in his 1990 reelection bid for governor, and Phil Bredesen carried it in his 2006 gubernatorial reelection bid.

Education

College
Columbia State Community College in Clifton

Public schools

Wayne County Adult Education Center
Frank Hughes School
Waynesboro Elementary School
Waynesboro Middle School
Wayne County High School
Wayne County Technology Center
Collinwood High School
Collinwood Middle School
Collinwood Elementary School

Media

Radio
AM 930 WWON Waynesboro, Tennessee
FM 94.9 WMSR-FM Collinwood, Tennessee
FM 106.5 WLVS-FM Clifton, Tennessee
FM 89.9 W210BE Waynesboro, Tennessee
FM 100.7 WWON-FM Waynesboro, Tennessee

Newspaper
The Wayne County News

Events
Singing on the Farm – Cypress Inn
Tour De Wayne Bicycle Ride
Fireworks Show – Waynesboro
Fourth of July in the Park – Waynesboro
Wayne County History and Craft Fair – Waynesboro
Old Timer's Day – Collinwood
Horseshoe Riverbend Festival – Clifton

Communities

Cities
Clifton
Collinwood
Waynesboro (county seat)

Unincorporated communities

Ashland
Beech Creek
Bethlehem
Cantrell Subdivision
Clifton Junction
Cromwell Crossroads
Crossroads
Cypress Inn
Dogwood Heights
Fairview
Flat Gap
Forrest Hills
Houston
Iron City (mostly in Lawrence County)
Leatherwood
Lutts
Martin's Mills
Topsy

Notable individuals
Lon A. Scott – member of the United States House of Representatives for the 8th congressional district of Tennessee
Thetus W. Sims –  politician and a member of the United States House of Representatives for the 8th congressional district of Tennessee

See also
National Register of Historic Places listings in Wayne County, Tennessee

References

External links

Official website 
Chamber of Commerce 
Wayne County News

 
1817 establishments in Tennessee
Populated places established in 1817
Middle Tennessee